Robert William Davidson (1904–1982) was an American sculptor.

Davidson was born in Indianapolis, Indiana in 1904.  He was an apprentice to his father, Oscar Davidson, also an artist.  He studied sculpture at the John Herron Art Institute (now the Herron School of Art), the Art Institute of Chicago, the School of American Sculpture in New York City, and the Bavarian Fine Arts Academy in Munich, Germany. His paternal lineage is traced to the early 17th century, the beginning of the colonies.

Davidson's wife, Maryetta Mauck, was an Indiana ceramics artist and they both graduated from the John Herron Art Institute in 1926.  They moved to Saratoga Springs, New York where Davidson taught art at Skidmore College from 1934 to 1972. He moved to Saratoga under the intention of creating the sculptures for the Hall of Springs yet through an unfortunate event, the man spearheading this project died, and the offer was not respected.  So, Davidson never fulfilled this job, however, he followed a career in Saratoga that would entail a life of mastering the Arts of his field; he educated those wanting of the arts and refined those of whom he, through an artist's eye, deemed  "the Artists of Mankind."

Davidson is a nationally known artist whose work is in the collections of the Indianapolis Museum of Art and the Smithsonian.  He has won many awards for his works including the Art Association Prize at the Herron Art Institute in 1925, the Harry Johnson Prize from Hoosier Salon in 1930, and two first prize wins at the Indiana State Fair in 1923 and 1924.  He died in Schenectady, New York in 1982.

According to a Hathorn Gallery, Skidmore College Retrospective Exhibition, on February 6–27, 1972 the following accolades were attributed to R.W. Davidson in his brochure:

References

1904 births
1982 deaths
Artists from Indianapolis
Herron School of Art and Design alumni
School of the Art Institute of Chicago alumni
Skidmore College faculty
20th-century American sculptors
American male sculptors
Sculptors from Indiana
20th-century American male artists